Peter James Ryan,  (born 18 May 1944) is a former British police officer who was the Commissioner of New South Wales Police in Australia from 1996 to 2002. His appointment was controversial and he resigned two years early.

Early life and education
Ryan was born on 18 May 1944 in Lancaster, Lancashire, to Laurence and Maureen Ryan.

Police career in England
Ryan joined Lancashire Constabulary on 16 January 1961 as a police cadet. He completed the training course at Bruche Police National Training Centre in 1963, and on 19 May was given his first posting as a probationer in Little Hulton on the outskirts of Greater Manchester. In 1968, Ryan was one of the first intake of police officers into the new University of Lancaster, and upon graduation with a Bachelor of Arts he was promoted to sergeant, and in 1973 was promoted to inspector stationed at headquarters in Preston.

Ryan joined the Metropolitan Police Service in London, and was Chief Superintendent at Chelsea Police Station during the Harrods bombing in December 1983. He was Chief Constable of Norfolk Constabulary from 1990 to 1993 and was then the first National Director of Police Training at the Police Staff College, Bramshill prior to his appointment in 1996 to the New South Wales Police in Australia.

Commissioner of New South Wales Police
Ryan was recruited to the Commissioner's position following the controversial Royal Commission into the New South Wales Police Service (Wood Royal Commission) into police corruption that ran from 1995 to 1997. He was appointed by the Premier of New South Wales, Bob Carr.

In February 1999, Ryan was reappointed for a further 5 years. Some aspects of the new contract were kept secret but the controversy over it caused it to be released in its entirety, and a parliamentary enquiry to investigate the circumstances surrounding its signing. The contract made Ryan the highest-paid public servant in Australia.

He resigned from the New South Wales Police Service in 2002, two years early, and received a payout of 455,000—12 months' salary.

Paul Whelan, the police minister who recommended Ryan as commissioner after approaching him in the United Kingdom, had recently retired from the ministry and it is believed that his successor Michael Costa did not want Ryan to remain as commissioner with the Opposition citing that Costa had made contradictory remarks about whether Ryan had resigned or was sacked and questioning whether Ryan was entitled to a payout if he had resigned.

Ryan has since worked on a number of security consulting projects. He is a security expert for the International Olympic Committee (IOC), and was the Principal Security Advisor to the ATHOC (Athens Olympic Games Organising Committee).

Ryan was covered widely by the Australian media and is the subject of the 2003 biography, Peter Ryan: The Inside Story, by Sydney author Sue Williams.

Honours
Ryan has been appointed an Officer of the Order of St John, and awarded the Queen's Police Medal, NSW Police Ministers Olympic Commendation, NSW Police Commissioners Olympic Citation and the Police Long Service and Good Conduct Medal (for service in the UK Police Forces). He has a master's degree in science and an honorary doctorate in law from Macquarie University, Sydney.

Personal life
Ryan married his second wife Adrienne Ryan (née Butterworth), who moved to Sydney with him upon his appointment as Police Commissioner. They divorced in 2011, after a separation of about six years. While she continued to reside in Australia with their two adult daughters, Ryan moved back to the United Kingdom. One daughter undertook legal studies in the UK and the other studied in Australia for a communications degree.

References

External links
 List of Commissioners of New South Wales Police
  , 136 pages, State Government of New South Wales, General Purpose Standing Committee No 3, 31 May 2000. Retrieved 29 September 2020. 

1944 births
Living people
Commissioners of the New South Wales Police
British Chief Constables
British expatriates in Australia
Metropolitan Police officers
English recipients of the Queen's Police Medal
Macquarie University alumni
People from Lancaster, Lancashire
Officers of the Order of St John
Alumni of Lancaster University